The Active Club of Philadelphia was a Negro league baseball team which played in Philadelphia in the 1880s.

References
Loverro, Thom. The Encyclopedia of Negro League Baseball. New York:Facts on File, Inc., 2003. .

Negro league baseball teams
Sports in Philadelphia
Defunct baseball teams in Pennsylvania
Baseball teams disestablished in 1889
Baseball teams established in 1880